Lazuli are a French progressive rock band, formed in Southern France in 1998 by Claude and Dominique Leonetti.

History 
After their formation in 1998, their first album, the self-titled Lazuli, was released in 1999 and struggled in popularity. However, over many years the band have changed and refined their sound finding increased popularity and appreciation.

Their second album, Amnésie, in 2004, helped Lazuli to sign with the Night & Day distribution group.

On 2 and 3 July 2005, Lazuli attended the Montreux Jazz Festival and received an award for "Under the sky".

Key dates 
 1999 : Concert at FIMU in Belfort, France)
 2004 : Second album "Amnésie"
 2 & 3 July 2005 : Montreux Jazz Festival (Switzerland)
 11 March 2006 : Baja Prog Festival in Mexicali (Mexico)
 12 April 2006 : Concert at Colos-Saal in Aschaffenburg (Germany)
 5 August 2006 : KOMMZ-Festival in Aschaffenburg (Germany)
 12 August 2006: Concert in Bergerac, Dordogne (France), invited by Ange.
 18 January 2007 : Colos-Saal à Aschaffenburg (Germany)
 2 May 2009 : Rites of Spring festival (United States)
 29 November 2009 : Lazuli announce split http://www.progforums.com/punforum/viewtopic.php?pid=1127#p1127
 7 October 2011 : Headlined the Summers End festival in Lydney United Kingdom
 2015 : Lazuli supported Fish on his entire "Farewell To Childhood" European tour in November and December 2015.

Musical style 

Lazuli combine progressive rock with world and electro music.
Besides guitar, keyboards and drums the band plays also léode, vibraphone and horn; until 2009, split chapman stick, marimba and warr guitar were used as well.

Claude Leonetti invented and plays the léode, because he cannot use his left arm after a motorcycle accident.

Their lyrics are entirely in French.

Band members 

Current members
Claude Leonetti – léode (1998–present)
Dominique Leonetti – vocals, guitar (1998–present)
Arnaud Beyney – guitar, bass guitar  (2020–present)
Vincent Barnavol – drums (2010–present)
Romain Thorel – keyboards (2010–present)

Former members
Gédéric Byar – Guitar (2007–2020)
Fred Juan – marimba, percussion (1998–2009)
Sylvain Bayol – chapman stick, warr guitar (1998–2009)
Yohan Simeon – percussion (1998–2009)

Discography 
Studio albums
 Lazuli (1999)
 Amnésie (2004)
 En avant doute... (2007)
 Réponse incongrue à l'inéluctable (2009)
 4603 battements (2011)
 Tant que l'herbe est grasse (2014)
 Nos âmes saoules (2016)
 Saison 8 (2018)
 Le Fantastique Envol de Dieter Böhm (2020)
 Dénudé (2021)
Video albums
 6 frenchmen in Amsterdam – Live at Paradiso DVD (2009)
 Live @ l'Abeille Rôde DVD (2013)
 Nos âmes saoules Live 2016 DVD (2016)

References

External links 

 Official web site 

French progressive rock groups
Musea artists